The 4th constituency of Guadeloupe is a French legislative Constituency in the Overseas department of Guadeloupe. Since 2022, is represented by Élie Califer of the Socialist Party. Guadeloupe is composed of four Constituencies.

Deputies

Election results

2022 

 
 
|-
| colspan="8" bgcolor="#E9E9E9"|
|-
 

 
 
 
 * Withdrew after the first round.

2017

2012

See also 
 Arrondissements of Guadeloupe
 Cantons of Guadeloupe
 Constituency (France)
 Deputy (France)

References

External links

Guadeloupe department

Constituencies of France 

 

 

4
Les Saintes representation into Guadeloupe administration